Louis Borel (6 October 1905 – 24 April 1973) was a Dutch stage and film actor. During the 1930s, he appeared in a number of British films, such as the musical Head over Heels (1937). He later moved to the United States and worked in Hollywood.

Filmography

References

Bibliography
 Larkin, Colin. The Encyclopedia of Popular Music, Volume 4. Oxford University Press, 2006.

External links

1905 births
1973 deaths
Dutch male stage actors
Dutch male film actors
20th-century Dutch male actors
Male actors from The Hague
Dutch expatriates in the United States
Expatriate male actors in the United States
Dutch expatriates in the United Kingdom